The 1320s in music involved some events.

Events 
1321 – The Confrérie de St Julien-des-Ménétriers, the strongest of the medieval musicians' guilds, is established in Paris.
1322 – The Valladolid Council forbids hiring Moorish musicians to enliven Christian vigils.
1323 – Guillaume de Machaut becomes secretary to John of Luxembourg, King of Bohemia,
1326
March – Johannes de Muris moves to the double monastery of Fontevrault (Maine-et-Loire).
Robert de Handlo writes his treatise on music notation, Regule cum maximis magistri Franconis cum additionibus aliorum musicorum.

Compositions 
 1324 – Guillaume de Machaut – Bone pastor Guillerme/Bone pastor qui pastores/[tenor], motet for three voices, composed for the appointment of Guillaume de Trie as Archbishop of Reims.

Births

Deaths 
1325
7 January – Denis of Portugal, monarch and troubadour.
27 September – Amir Khusrow, Indian poet, scholar, and musician

References

 
14th century in music